Maxillaria amplifoliata is a member of the family Orchidaceae. It was previously in the genus Cryptocentrum, in which it was the largest species. Cryptocentrum is now synonymous with Maxillaria.

References

 Vanishing Beauty, vol. 1, Franco Pupulin

amplifoliata